Savyon is an affluent local council in the Central District of Israel, bordering the cities of Kiryat Ono and Yehud. Ranked 10/10 on the Israeli socio-economic scale, it is one of the wealthiest municipalities in Israel.

History
During the 18th and 19th centuries, the area of Savyon belonged to the Nahiyeh (sub-district) of Lod that encompassed the area of the present-day city of Modi'in-Maccabim-Re'ut in the south to the present-day city of El'ad in the north, and from the foothills in the east, through the Lod Valley to the outskirts of Jaffa in the west. This area was home to thousands of inhabitants in about 20 villages, who had at their disposal tens of thousands of hectares of prime agricultural land.

Savyon was founded in 1955 by Africa Israel Investments for elderly South African Jewish immigrants. A number of South African Jews settled in Israel, forming a South African community in Israel. Large houses were built in the style that the community was accustomed to from their life in South Africa, It took the name of a common wildflower, although the first part of its name (sav) means "grandfather", which was appropriate for the residents of the time. Today, Savyon has a young population.

In 2003, the moshav Ganei Yehuda was merged into Savyon.

Notable residents
Moshe Arens - defense and foreign minister
Aviv Bushinsky - businessman and journalist
Arye Carmon - co-founder of the Israeli Democracy Institute
Mikhail Chernoy - entrepreneur
Haim Cohen - chef
David D'Or - singer and composer
Maya Dunietz - recording artist
Shmuel Flatto-Sharon - businessman and politician
Jean Frydman - businessman
Dan Goldstein - founder of Formula Systems
Mody Kidon - businessman
Dan Margalit - journalist and television host
David Mor - businessman and politician
Dan Naveh - politician
Ofer Nimrodi - businessman and jurist
Yaakov Nimrodi - businessman and intelligence officer
Yair Nitzani - musician and comedian
Gideon Patt - politician
Al Schwimmer - engineer and businessman
Yair Shamir - politician , businessman, and military officer

References

Local councils in Central District (Israel)
Populated places established in 1951
1951 establishments in Israel
South African-Jewish culture in Israel